Lutypha is a genus of fungi in the family Typhulaceae. The genus is monotypic, containing the single clavarioid species Lutypha sclerotiophila, found in India. The generic name is an anagram of Typhula, a genus with which it has affinities.

References

Typhulaceae
Fungi of Asia
Monotypic Agaricales genera